is a Japanese dialect spoken in Fukuoka city. Hakata dialect originated in Hakata commercial district, while a related  was spoken in the central district. Hakata dialect has spread throughout the city and its suburbs. Most Japanese regard Hakata dialect as the dialect typical of Fukuoka Prefecture, so it is sometimes called .

Hakata dialect is being increasingly spoken in television interviews in Fukuoka, where previously standard Japanese was expected.

Grammar 
The basic grammar of Hakata dialect is similar to other Hichiku dialects such as Saga dialect, Nagasaki dialect, and Kumamoto dialect. For example, Hakata dialect uses to or tto as a question, e.g., "What are you doing?", realized in standard Japanese as nani o shiteiru no?, is nan ba shiyo tto? or nan shitō to? in Hakata and other Hichiku dialects.

References

External links 
 Fukuoka-ben Study Website - u-biq
 単純明快博多弁辞典 

Japanese dialects
City colloquials
Culture in Fukuoka